Aminatta Forna, OBE (born 1964), is a Scottish and Sierra Leonean writer. She is the author of a memoir, The Devil That Danced on the Water: A Daughter's Quest, and four novels: Ancestor Stones (2006), The Memory of Love (2010), The Hired Man (2013) and Happiness (2018). Her novel The Memory of Love was awarded the Commonwealth Writers' Prize for "Best Book" in 2011, and was also shortlisted for the Orange Prize for Fiction. Forna is Professor of Creative Writing at Bath Spa University and was, until recently, Sterling Brown Distinguished Visiting professor at Williams College in Massachusetts. She is currently Director and Lannan Foundation Chair of Poetics of the Lannan Center for Poetics and Social Practice at Georgetown University.

Forna won the 2014 Windham–Campbell Literature Prize (fiction).

Forna was appointed Officer of the Order of the British Empire (OBE) in the 2017 New Year Honours for services to literature. Forna is a fellow of the Royal Society of Literature, sits on the advisory committee for the Royal Literary Fund and the Caine Prize for African Writing, has been a judge on several high-profile prize panels, including the 2017 Baileys Women's Prize for Fiction and continues to champion the work of up-and-coming diverse authors. In March 2019, Forna's Happiness was shortlisted for the European Literature Prize, and in April 2019 was shortlisted for the Royal Society of Literature (RSL) Ondaatje Prize and for the Jhalak Prize

Background

Aminatta Forna was born in Bellshill, Scotland, in 1964 to a Sierra Leonean father, Mohamed Forna, and a Scottish mother, Maureen Christison. When Forna was six months old the family travelled to Sierra Leone, where Mohamed Forna worked as a physician. He later became involved in politics and entered government, only to resign citing a growth in political violence and corruption. Between 1970 and 1973 he was imprisoned and declared an Amnesty Prisoner of Conscience. Mohamed Forna was hanged on charges of treason in 1975. The events of Forna's childhood and her investigation into the conspiracy surrounding her father's death are the subject of the memoir The Devil That Danced on the Water. The trauma of her father's death is a contributing factor to the common theme of psychological trauma throughout many of her novels.

Forna studied law at University College London and was a Harkness Fellow at the University of California, Berkeley. In 2013 she assumed a post as Professor of Creative Writing at Bath Spa University.

Between 1989 and 1999, Forna worked for the BBC, both in radio and television, as a reporter and documentary maker in the spheres of arts and politics. She is also known for her Africa documentaries: Through African Eyes (1995), Africa Unmasked (2002) and The Lost Libraries of Timbuktu (2009). Forna is also a board member of the Royal National Theatre and a judge for The Man Booker International Prize 2013.

Forna is the founder of The Rogbonko Village Project, a charity begun as an initiative to build a school in a village in Sierra Leone.

Aminatta Forna is married to the furniture designer Simon Westcott and lives in south-east London.

Writing
Forna's work, both fiction and non-fiction, is typically concerned with the prelude and aftermath to war, memory, the conflict between private narratives and official histories, and examines how the gradual accretion of small, seemingly insignificant acts of betrayal find expression in full-scale horror. In her fiction she employs multiple voices and shifting timelines.

The Devil that Danced on the Water
The Devil that Danced on the Water (2002), Forna's first book, received wide critical acclaim across the UK and the US. It was broadcast on BBC Radio and went on to become runner-up for the UK's Samuel Johnson Prize for non-fiction. This memoir discusses the murder of her father, Mohamed Forna, as he was taken by the state secret police and was executed a year later. The anger and sadness of this traumatic event permeates through the writing in Forna's memoir.

Ancestor Stones
Ancestor Stones, Forna's second book and first novel, won the Hurston-Wright Legacy Award for debut fiction in the US and the Literaturpreis in Germany and was nominated for the International Dublin Literary Award. The Washington Post named Ancestor Stones one of the most important books of 2006. In 2007, Forna was named by Vanity Fair magazine as one of Africa's best new writers.

The Memory of Love
The Memory of Love, winner of the Commonwealth Writers' Prize Best Book Award 2011, was described by the judges as "a bold, deeply moving and accomplished novel" and Forna as "among the most talented writers in literature today"; The Memory of Love was also shortlisted for the International Dublin Literary Award 2012, the Orange Prize for Fiction 2011 and the Warwick Prize for Writing. The book was the subject of the BBC Radio 4 programme Bookclub, in discussion between Forna and James Naughtie.

Girl Rising
Forna was one of 10 writers contributing to 10x10 Girl Rising. The film tells the stories of 10 girls in 10 developing countries. The girls' stories are written by 10 acclaimed writers and narrated by 10 world-class actresses, including Meryl Streep, Anne Hathaway, Freida Pinto and Cate Blanchett. The film premiered at Sundance Film Festival in January 2013. Forna wrote through the lens of Mariama, an intelligent woman who studies engineering in university and strives to extend the opportunity of education to young girls. Her role models are also advocates of education, including Sia Koroma, who is the First Lady of Sierra Leone.

The Hired Man
The Hired Man, Forna's third novel, was published in the UK in March 2013.

Critics praised Forna's forensic research and ability to evoke atmosphere, place, pacing, precision, powerful emotions, characterisations and atmosphere. In the United States The Boston Globe stated that "not since Remains of the Day has an author so skilfully revealed the way history's layers are often invisible to all but its participants, who do what they must to survive".

Happiness
Happiness, Forna's fourth novel, published in the US in March 2018, and in the UK in April 2018, explores themes of love, trauma, migration and belonging, the conflict between nature and civilisation, and how multi-layered experiences can grow resilience. Psychiatrist Dr. Attila Asara of Ghana and Jean Turane of America meet by chance and grow from their newfound relationship. One of Attila's main arguments of the novel is that people try to live out a "wrinkle-free" life, although Attila argues that one must live in discomfort to live a full life. Attila compares trauma survivors and Turane's foxes: the foxes try to outsmart humans while trauma survivors outsmart the damage they went through to try to maintain a normal life.

Happiness has featured on several recommended reading lists, including BBC Culture, The Root, The Guardian, Irish Times, and i News.

The Star Tribune described Happiness as "a tightly focused two-hander". The Financial Times review of Happiness said: "Forna is a risk-taker, a writer who doesn't hold back from tackling big themes". The Washington Post described Forna as a "subtle and knowing" writer able to fold "weighty matter into her buoyant creation with a sublimely delicate touch", while The Seattle Times wrote: "Forna's prose is precise ... stunning in its clarity". Kirkus Reviews, featuring the author on its cover, wrote: "Low-key yet piercingly empathetic, Forna's latest explores instinct, resilience, and the complexity of human coexistence, reaffirming her reputation for exceptional ability and perspective." The Sunday Times review notes: "Forna circles ... Her path is never straight, she doubles back, crisscrosses ... she approaches the thought from elliptical angles, bringing moments of startling clarity. This walk is never dull." The Observer′s Alex Preston wrote of Happiness: "It is as if the author has privileged access into multiple spheres of existence, learning the secret languages of each". Reviewing Happiness in The Guardian, Diana Evans wrote that it "builds in resonance beyond the final page". In The Spectator, Kate Webb wrote of Happiness: "Forna's piercingly intelligent and interrogative novel ... registers tectonic shifts taking place in the world and provokes us to think anew about war, and what we take for peace and happiness."

Happiness was featured on numerous international end-of-2018 round-ups as one of the best books of the year, including Kirkus Reviews, the UK's Guardian, and South Africa's Sunday Times.

Happiness was longlisted for the European Literature Prize in March 2019, and shortlisted for both the Royal Society of Literature (RSL) Ondaatje Prize, and the Jhalak Prize in April 2019.

The Window Seat
In December 2020, in a conversation with Maaza Mengiste published by LitHub, Forna revealed the cover of, and announced, that an essay collection named The Window Seat would be published in May 2021.

In January 20201, LitHub listed The Window Seat as one of the most anticipated books of 2021, Harper's Magazines reviewer wrote: "With this collection, she proves a compelling essayist too, her voice direct, lucid, and fearless. All the pieces are enjoyable and often surprising, even when rather slight. But the most substantial ones are memorable—even unforgettable. They deftly straddle the personal and the political." The Boston Globe singled out Forna's "fine command over both language and life", also noting "her vivid, keenly observed anecdotes [which] make her tendency toward hope all the more reassuring." Time magazine selected The Window Seat as one of twelve "must read" books in May 2021. The Washington Independent Review of Books described The Window Seat as "a collection that defies convention. It may just be the perfect post-pandemic read, and Forna the ideal post-pandemic writer." The Los Angeles Times singled out Forna's ability to weave in "experiences that are so individual another essayist would make them the center of a piece, like the time she flew a plane on a loop-de-loop or when she had an audience with the Queen. Here they are part of the texture of her understanding of the world" and singled out The Window Seat as "intelligent, curious and broad." The New York Times review commented that "Forna's ruminations are deeply felt yet unsentimental ... whose wide-ranging subjects chart a path toward a kind of freedom, to be at home, always elsewhere."

Bibliography

 Happiness, Atlantic Monthly, March 2018.

Awards and honours
2003 Samuel Johnson Prize (shortlist), The Devil that Danced on the Water
2007 Hurston-Wright Legacy Award (winner), Ancestor Stones
2007 International Dublin Literary Award (nomination), Ancestor Stones
2008 Liberaturpreis (winner), Ancestor Stones
2010 Aidoo-Snyder Book Prize, Ancestor Stones
2010 BBC National Short Story Award (nomination), "Haywards Heath"
2010 Warwick Prize for Writing (shortlist), The Memory of Love
2011 Commonwealth Writers' Prize (winner), The Memory of Love
2011 Orange Prize for Fiction (shortlist), The Memory of Love
2012 International Dublin Literary Award (shortlist), The Memory of Love
2014 Windham–Campbell Literature Prize (Fiction), valued at $150,000 one of the largest prizes in the world of its kind.
2016 Neustadt International Prize for Literature (finalist)
2017 New Year Honours OBE for services to Literature
2019: OkayAfricas "One Hundred Women"
2019: European Literature Prize longlist
2019: Royal Society of Literature finalist
2019: Ondaatje Prize finalist
2019: Jhalak Prize finalist

References

External links

 
 Maya Jaggi, "Aminatta Forna: a life in writing", The Guardian, 3 May 2013.
 Aminatta Forna, "The Afterlife of a Memoir", New York Review of Books, 13 November 2017.
 "Twenty Questions with Aminatta Forna", The Times Literary Supplement,16 April 2018.
 Jennifer Malec, "'I like writing male characters—I don't have to get them home safely at the end of the chapter'—An interview with Aminatta Forna", The Johannesburg Review of Books, 1 October 2018.
 "Aminatta Forna", Lannan Center for Poetics and Social Practice, Georgetown University.

1964 births
Living people
People from Bellshill
Alumni of University College London
Academics of Bath Spa University
Black British women writers
Fellows of the Royal Society of Literature
Scottish memoirists
Scottish women novelists
Scottish people of Sierra Leonean descent
Sierra Leonean women writers
Sierra Leonean novelists
British women short story writers
21st-century Scottish novelists
21st-century Scottish women writers
British women memoirists
21st-century British short story writers